Richard Melancthon Hurd (June 14, 1865 – June 6, 1941) was a pioneer real estate economist and political activist.

Hurd was born in New York City and attended St. Paul's School. He graduated from Yale University in 1888, where he was a member of Skull and Bones and an editor of The Yale Record. Particularly in his youth he was an avid hiker and mountain climber and visited Europe during summer with his father to enjoy the activity.

He headed the mortgage department of the U.S. Mortgage & Trust Company in 1895. He married Lucy Gazzam of Seattle, Washington in Mobile, Alabama in 1898 and had five children. He was president of the Lawyers' Mortgage Insurance Company in 1903 when he published Principles of City Land Values.

During the First World War he was active as an officer of the American Defense Society, an organization that promoted America's entry into World War I and civilian initiatives to suppress dissent during the conflict. He was a close friend of Theodore Roosevelt. In 1917, when he was vice-president and director of the Mortgage Bond Company of New York, he was appointed a New York State Prison Commissioner. He was later President of Lawyers Mortgage Trust, a securitizer of urban commercial property mortgages. The company suffered financial losses and closed during the depression.

His son Clement Hurd was an illustrator, known for the children's book Goodnight Moon.

He died at the Columbia Presbyterian Medical Center in New York City. He had been ill for more than a month.

Notes

Sources
New York Times: "German Boycott Efforts," November 18, 1918, accessed May 24, 2010
New York Times: "Attacks German Insurance," November 12, 1917, accessed May 24, 2010
New York Times: "Wants No Credit Given to Germany," November 22, 1918, accessed May 24, 2010

External links
Richard M. Hurd, "Principles of City Land Values" (1903)
John W. Leonard, ed., Who's Who in New York City and State (NY: L.R. Hamersly & Company, 1909), vol. 4, 716, View

1865 births
1941 deaths
Writers from Brooklyn
Economists from New York (state)
St. Paul's School (New Hampshire) alumni
American male non-fiction writers
The Yale Record alumni
Activists from New York City